Halkett Bay Marine Provincial Park is a provincial park off Gambier Island in British Columbia, Canada.

References

External links
 http://www.env.gov.bc.ca/bcparks/explore/parkpgs/halkett_bay

Provincial parks of British Columbia
Sunshine Coast Regional District
Gambier Island
Year of establishment missing